Saliha Sultan ("the devoutus one"; 16 June 1811 – 5 February 1843) was an Ottoman princess, the daughter of Sultan Mahmud II and Aşubcan Kadın. She was the half-sister of Sultans Abdulmejid I and Abdulaziz.

Early life
Saliha Sultan was born 16 June 1811 in the Topkapı Palace. Her father was Sultan Mahmud II, and her mother was Aşubcan Kadın. In addition to various half-brothers and sisters, she had two infants-dead blood sisters, an older, Ayşe Sultan, and a younger, Şah Sultan. She was the granddaughter of Abdul Hamid I and Nakşidil Sultan.

Marriage
In 1834, when Saliha was twenty three years old, her father arranged her marriage to Damat Gürcü Halil Rifat Pasha. According to Sakaoğlu, she married older than the average for the princesses due to health problems. The marriage took place on a Saturday, 22 May 1834, in the Beşiktaş Waterfront Palace. The bridal procession of Saliha Sultan left this palace on Thursday, conveying the bride to Fındıklı Palace. The ladies of the marriage procession rode in carriages and coaches decorated with stars. 

Julia Pardoe, who observed the marriage from a caique on the Bosphorus noted the illumination of the waterfront palace of Esma Sultan. She writes that, "there must have been many hundred caiques wedged together in front of her terrace, and less than fifty of them contained musicians." The wedding ceremony was covered in the first official Ottoman newspaper Takvim-i Vekayi.

The couple owned the Neşatabad Palace located in Ortaköy Defterdarburnu and the Fındıklı Palace. The marriage wasn't happy, however they had two sons and a daughter.

According to Julia Pardoe, Saliha was a haughty person and had a turbulent relationship with her father Mahmud II. In her memoir of her journey on Istanbul, The Sultan and Domestic Manners of the Turks (1837), she relates two episodes in particular. 

In the first, Saliha would be harshly reprimanded by Mahmud II for ordering to beat a group of Ulema who had not bowed to her passing by in the carriage. 

In the second, Julia Pardoe reports that, on the occasion of the wedding of Saliha's half-sister, Mihrimah Sultan, there were no more imperial jewels to give her because Saliha had demanded all of them for her wedding and had never returned them. Besides, she never wore them, because she was too proud to lead a worldly life. Mahmud proposed to sell them, but she replied that no one would dare to buy the jewels of a princess. Mahmud then offered to buy them himself, and Saliha was forced to accept. In reality Mahmud cheated his daughter by paying them less than their value. It not know if Saliha found out of not, but in any case she not dared complain

Death
Saliha Sultan died on 5 February 1843 at the age of thirty one in the Fındıklı Palace, and was buried in the mausoleum of Nakşidil Sultan, Fatih Mosque, Istanbul.

After her death, Halil married Ismet Hanım. The two together had one son, Asaf Mahmud Celaleddin Pasha, who married Saliha's niece Seniha Sultan, daughter of her half-brother, Sultan Abdulmejid I.

Issue
By her marriage, Saliha Sultan had two sons and a daughter:
Sultanzade Abdülhamid Bey Efendi (2 March 1835 - March 1837).
Sultanzade Cavid Bey Efendi (1837 - ?).
Ayşe Şıdıka Hanımsultan (1841 - 1886). She married Server Paşah, son of Said Server Efendi. She had at least three daughters, Ayşe Hanim, Azize Hanim and Fatma Hanım. At least two married and had issue. Azize married Hariciyeci Suad Bey, and they had two sons Ziya Songülen and Mahmud Bey and a daughter Fehire Hanim, and Fatma married Fehmi Bey, son of grand vizier Mehmed Esad Saffet Pasha, and had one son Halil Bey and a daughter Belkis Hanım.

In popular culture
 In 2018 Turkish historical fiction TV series Kalbimin Sultanı, Saliha is portrayed by Turkish actress Aslıhan Malbora.

See also
 List of Ottoman princesses

Ancestry

References

Sources
 
 
 

1811 births
1843 deaths
19th-century Ottoman princesses